Hassan Farhan Hassoun (born 29 June 1953) is an Iraqi retired footballer who played as a defender.

Club career
Farhan played his entire career for Al-Jaish, where he won the 1983–84 Iraqi National League.

International career
He played his first international match against Algeria at the 1973 Palestine Cup of Nations. He won two World Military Cup in 1977 in Damascus and in 1979 in Kuwait, and the 5th Arabian Gulf Cup in Baghdad, scoring in the final group match against Saudi Arabia. In addition, he was the captain of his country during the 1980 Summer Olympics.

International goals
Scores and results list Iraq's goal tally first.

Managerial career
He managed several teams in different countries, such as in Iraq: Al-Jaish, Ramadi, Al-Kut, Al-Quwa Al-Jawiya, Al-Shorta and Amanat Baghdad; in Jordan: Al-Wehdat and Al-Hussein; in Bahrain: Riffa and Bahrain, where he won the 1988–89 Bahraini Premier League; and in Syria: Al-Wahda.

See also
 List of men's footballers with 100 or more international caps

References

External links
 
 
 

1953 births
Living people
Iraqi footballers
Sportspeople from Baghdad
Association football defenders
Iraq international footballers
Footballers at the 1974 Asian Games
Footballers at the 1978 Asian Games
Footballers at the 1980 Summer Olympics
Olympic footballers of Iraq
Al-Shorta SC managers
FIFA Century Club
Asian Games competitors for Iraq
Al-Quwa Al-Jawiya managers
Iraqi football managers